English indie rock band Florence and the Machine has won 24 awards out of 107 nominations. In 2011 they released "Dog Days Are Over", the single was a commercial success and was nominated for two awards at the 2011 Billboard Music Awards and the music video for the song was nominated for four awards at the 2010 MTV Video Music Awards, including Video of the Year, and won for Best Art Direction. At the 53rd Annual Grammy Awards they received their first Grammy nomination which was for Best New Artist. They have won two out of eight Brit Awards nominations, the Critics' Choice in 2009 and for British Album of the Year for Lungs in 2010. At the 55th Annual Grammy Awards their album Ceremonials earned them two nominations, Grammy Award for Best Pop Vocal Album for the album and Grammy Award for Best Pop Duo/Group Performance for "Shake It Out", the first single of the album. While at the 58th Annual Grammy Awards their album How Big, How Blue, How Beautiful earned them three more nominations, Best Pop Vocal Album for the album, Best Pop Duo/Group Performance for "Ship to Wreck", the second single of the album and Best Rock Performance for "What Kind of Man", the lead single of the album.

ARIA Music Awards

BBC Sound Of

BBC Music Awards

Billboard Music Awards 
The Billboard Music Awards are held to honor artists for commercial performance in the U.S., based on record charts published by Billboard. The band has been nominated twice.

Brit Awards
The Brit Awards are the British Phonographic Industry's (BPI) annual pop music awards. Florence and the Machine has received two awards from twelve nominations.

Camerimage
Camerimage is a Polish film festival dedicated to the celebration of cinematography. The band has been nominated twice.

D&AD Awards 
Design and Art Direction (D&AD) is a British educational charity which exists to promote excellence in design and advertising.

Grammy Awards
The Grammy Awards are awarded annually by the National Academy of Recording Arts and Sciences (NARAS). The band has received seven nominations.

Note: "What Kind of Man" was nominated for Best Rock Song in 2016, which are only presented to the songwriter of the song, John Hill, Tom Hull and Florence Welch.

Mercury Prize

MTV

MTV Europe Music Awards
The MTV Europe Music Awards was established in 1994 by MTV Europe to award the music videos from European and international artists. The band has been nominated four times.

MTV Video Music Awards
The MTV Video Music Awards was established in 1984 by MTV to award the music videos of the year. The band has won one out of seven nominations.

MTV Video Music Awards Japan

NME Awards

Q Awards
The Q Awards are the UK's annual music awards run by the music magazine Q.

UK Festival Awards

UK Music Video Awards

Webby Awards
{| class="wikitable plainrowheaders" style="width:70%;
|-
! scope="col" style="width:4%;"| Year
! scope="col" style="width:50%;"| Category
! scope="col" style="width:35%;"| Nominated work
! scope="col" style="width:6%;"| Result
! scope="col" style="width:6%;"| 
|-
| 2019
| Best Music Video
| "Big God"
| 
|

Other awards
{| class="wikitable plainrowheaders" style="width:80%;
|-
! scope="col" style="width:4%;"| Year
! scope="col" style="width:35%;"| Award
! scope="col" style="width:40%;"| Category
! scope="col" style="width:40%;"| Nominated work
! scope="col" style="width:6%;"| Result
|-
|rowspan="2"|2009
|rowspan="2"|Studio8 Media International Music Award
|Female Voice of July 2009
|Florence and the Machine
|
|-
|Song of July 2009
|"Rabbit Heart (Raise It Up)"
|
|-
|rowspan="15"|2010
|South Bank Show
|South Bank Show Award
|rowspan="2"|Florence and the Machine
|
|-
|Glamour Women of the Year Awards
|Band of the Year
|
|-
| D&AD Awards
| Graphite Pencil
| "Drumming Song"
| 
|-
|rowspan="3"|Meteor Music Awards
|Best International Album
|Lungs
|
|-
|Best International Band
|rowspan="3"|Florence and the Machine
|
|-
|Best International Live Performance
|
|-
|Elle Style Awards
|Musician of the Year
|
|-
|rowspan="4"|MOJO Awards
|Breakthrough Act
|rowspan="2"|Florence and the Machine
|
|-
|Best Live Act
|
|-
|Song of the Year
|"You've Got the Love"
|
|-
|Best Album
|Lungs
|
|-
|rowspan="2"|BT Digital Music Awards
|Best Female Artist
|Florence and the Machine
|
|-
|Best Song
|"You've Got the Love"
|
|-
|rowspan="2"|European Festival Awards
|Anthem of the Year
|"You've Got the Love"
|
|-
|Best Newcomer
| Florence and the Machine
|
|-
|rowspan="5"|2011
|rowspan="2"|Virgin Media Music Awards
|Best Collaboration
|Florence and the Machine with Dizzee Rascal
|
|-
|Best Video
|"Dog Days Are Over"
|
|-
|rowspan="2"|International Dance Music Awards
|Best Alternative/Rock Dance Track
|"Dog Days Are Over" (Yeasayer Remix)
|
|-
|Best Break-Through Artist (Group)
|rowspan="2"|Florence and the Machine
|
|-
|Glamour Women of the Year Awards
|Best Band
|
|-
|rowspan="3"|2012
|Elle Style Awards
|Best Music Act
|Florence and the Machine
|
|-
|World Soundtrack Awards
|Best Original Song Written Directly for a Film
|"Breath of Life"
|
|-
|Ivor Novello Awards
|Best Song Musically and Lyrically
|"Shake It Out"
|
|-
|rowspan="4"|2013
|ECHO Awards
|Best International Rock/Pop Group
|Florence and the Machine
|
|-
| Spike Video Game Awards
| Best Song in a Game
| "I'm Not Calling You a Liar"
| 
|-
|rowspan="2"|World Music Awards
|World's Best Album
|Ceremonials
|
|-
|World's Best Group
|Florence and the Machine
|
|-
|rowspan="3"|2015
|Live Music Business Awards
|Best Festival Performance (Glastonbury)
|Florence + The Machine
|
|-
|rowspan="2"|European Festival Awards
|Headliner Of The Year
|Florence + The Machine
|
|-
|Anthem of the Year
|Ship To Wreck
|
|-
| rowspan=1|2016
| Helpmann Awards
| Best International Contemporary Music Concert
| How Big, How Blue, How Beautiful Tour
| 
|-
| rowspan=1|2018
| rowspan=3|Global Awards
| rowspan=3|Best Indie
| rowspan=3|Florence + The Machine
| 
|-
| 2019
| 
|-
| 2020
| 
|-
| rowspan=1|2021
| World Soundtrack Awards
| Best Original Song
| Call Me Cruella
|

See also
Florence Welch § Awards and nominations

References 

Florence and the Machine